Winfield Scott "Kid" Camp (December 8, 1869 – March 2, 1895) was an American professional baseball player born in New Albany, Ohio who played two season in Major League Baseball as a pitcher.  He appeared in four games for the 1892 Pittsburgh Pirates and in three games for the 1894 Chicago Colts.  He was the brother of infielder Lew Camp, who was his teammate in 1894.

Camp died at the age of 25 in Omaha, Nebraska, and is interred at Forest Lawn Memorial Park.

References

Major League Baseball pitchers
Pittsburgh Pirates players
Chicago Colts players
Seattle Reds players
Seattle Hustlers players
Oakland Colonels players
Augusta Electricians players
Indianapolis Hoosiers (minor league) players
Sioux City Cornhuskers players
1869 births
1895 deaths
Baseball players from Ohio
19th-century baseball players
People from New Albany, Ohio